George Zahringer III (born April 23, 1953 in Saginaw, Michigan) is an amateur golfer and stockbroker from New York, New York. He attended Stonehill College.

Tournament wins
this list may be incomplete
1980 Long Island Amateur
1982 Metropolitan Amateur, Long Island Amateur
1984 Metropolitan Amateur, New York State Amateur
1985 Metropolitan Amateur, Metropolitan Open (as an amateur)
1986 Metropolitan Amateur
1987 Metropolitan Amateur
2002 U.S. Mid-Amateur
2013 British Senior Amateur
2015 MET Senior Amateur

Major tournament appearances
U.S. Senior Open seven times - best finish: T31 (2005)
2003 Masters Tournament

Other top amateur performances
U.S. Mid-Amateur
Runner-up: 2001
Semi-finalist: 2003
Quarter-finalist: 1986 and 1987
U.S. Amateur
Quarter-finalist: 1992 and 2003
British Amateur
Quarter-finalist: 1991
U.S. Senior Amateur
Runner-up: 2008

U.S. national team appearances
Amateur
Walker Cup:  2003

References

American male golfers
Amateur golfers
Golfers from Michigan
Stockbrokers
1953 births
Living people